Virginia Beahan (born 1946) is an American photographer. 

Her work is included in the collections of the Smithsonian American Art Museum, the Museum of Contemporary Art San Diego, the Harvard Art Museums and the Getty Museum.

References

1946 births
Artists from Philadelphia
20th-century American women artists
21st-century American women artists
20th-century women photographers
21st-century women photographers
Living people
Artists in the Smithsonian American Art Museum collection